"Moulin des Veaux" is a French watermill in Chavenon in the Allier départment in the Auvergne Region

History
Watermill of Veaux on the river Aumance (the last one on this French river). The Aumance is a tributary of the Cher. This mill is on the Cassini map. It belonged to Château de Laly ( Le Montet) and Château de Saint-Hubert (Chavenon).

References

External links 
Moulins du Centre

Buildings and structures in Allier
Agricultural buildings in France
Watermills in France